Heart Pond (also known as Hart Pond, Baptist Pond or Baptist lake) is a great pond located in the southwestern corner of Chelmsford, Massachusetts. The pond borders the town of Westford, Massachusetts. The pond has a surface area of 91 acres and a maximum depth of 20 ft. The pond is a warm water fishery and is a popular fishing spot in the town containing, Largemouth bass, Black Bullhead, Chain Pickerel, White and Yellow perch as well as Sunfish.

Formation
Heart Pond is a large kettle pond, meaning it was formed by retreating glaciers or draining floodwaters. It is primarily fed by Pond Brook.

Swimming
The beach is available for swimmers from dusk to dawn, along with on-duty lifeguards from the last Saturday in June through Labor Day, September 4th.

Ice harvesting
In the 1800s and early 1900s, the lake was used by the Daniel Gage Ice Company for harvesting ice.

References 

Chelmsford, Massachusetts